The Samuel R. McKelvie National Forest is a United States National Forest in the north-central Sandhills region of the U.S. state of Nebraska. The forest is managed as part of the U.S. Forest Service's Nebraska National Forests and Grasslands, from ranger district offices in Halsey, Nebraska. The national forest is entirely within Cherry County, Nebraska.

History
In 1902, President Theodore Roosevelt issued a proclamation establishing the Niobrara Forest Reserve, later the Niobrara Ranger District of the Nebraska National Forest. On October 15, 1971, President Richard Nixon designated the Niobrara Division the Samuel R. McKelvie National Forest after former Governor Samuel R. McKelvie.

Flora and fauna
The forest is a combination of prairie grasslands and pine forest "islands". Most of the existing forested sections were manmade, planted by hand over the past 75 years. The protein content of the native grasses is among the highest found anywhere in the world and numerous lease options are provided to local ranchers. Planted trees include eastern juniper, Scots pine and ponderosa pine which continues to need replanting as it is harvested but has also managed to spread throughout the region independently.

Indigenous wildlife such as pronghorn, white-tailed deer, mule deer, coyote and fox are plentiful. Of the 150 species of birds known to inhabit the forest, pheasant, grouse, hawk and wild turkey are the more commonly found.

Recreation
The forest has a small campground. Immediately to the south and east of the national forest is Merritt Reservoir, a dam on the Snake River. The reservoir is stocked with sport fish; it is considered one of the better fishing destinations in Nebraska. Merritt Reservoir is managed by the Nebraska Game and Parks Commission.

Management and additional lands
The Nebraska National Forest is managed by the Nebraska National Forests and Grasslands Supervisor's Office in Chadron. Additionally, this office manages the following public lands:
Nebraska National Forest
Buffalo Gap National Grassland
Fort Pierre National Grassland
Oglala National Grassland

See also

List of U.S. National Forests

References

External links
 Samuel R. McKelvie National Forest - Nebraska National Forests and Grasslands
 Cool State Parks: Samuel R. McKelvie National Forest

Protected areas established in 1971
Protected areas of Cherry County, Nebraska
National Forests of Nebraska
1971 establishments in Nebraska